Indian River flows into Black Lake near Rossie, New York. The outlets of Red Lake, Lake of the Woods, and Muskellunge Lake flow into the Indian River. The river is part of the Oswegatchie River watershed.

References 

Rivers of St. Lawrence County, New York
Rivers of New York (state)